Laura De Marchi (born 25 July 1936) is an Italian actress.

Selected filmography

References

External links 
 

1936 births
Living people
Place of birth missing (living people)
Italian film actresses